División de Honor de Béisbol 2012 is the 27th season since its establishment. 2012 season started on February 25.

El Llano BC was promoted from 1ª División and replaces relegated team Sevilla Red Sox. After FC Barcelona baseball team was disbanded, the players created a new team called Béisbol Barcelona.

The two first teams of the regular season will play a best-of-five series playoff for the title. The last team will be relegated to 1ª División.

Regular season standings

Final playoffs
The regular season leader will play at home games number 3, 4 and 5.

References

External links
2012 season at rfebeisbolsofbol.com

División de Honor de Béisbol